Acleris stachi is a species of moth of the family Tortricidae. It is found in China (Xinjiang). It was described by Józef Razowski in 1953 (as Peronea stachi).

References

stachi
Moths described in 1953
Taxa named by Józef Razowski
Moths of Asia